is a railway station in Nagato, Yamaguchi Prefecture, Japan.

Lines 
West Japan Railway Company
Mine Line

Layout 
Itamochi Station has one side platform serving bi-directional traffic.

Railway stations in Japan opened in 1958
Railway stations in Yamaguchi Prefecture